Konstantin Yuryevich Petrov (born 16 January 1964) is a retired Kazakhstani butterfly swimmer. He won a bronze medal at the 1988 Summer Olympics and a gold medal at the 1987 European Aquatics Championships in the 4 × 100 m medley relay.

References

1964 births
Living people
Kazakhstani male butterfly swimmers
Olympic swimmers of the Soviet Union
Swimmers at the 1988 Summer Olympics
European Aquatics Championships medalists in swimming
Medalists at the 1988 Summer Olympics
Olympic bronze medalists for the Soviet Union
Soviet male swimmers
20th-century Kazakhstani people
21st-century Kazakhstani people